Nora Mary Crawford (née Parker, 25 June 1917 – 1 January 1997) was a New Zealand policewoman. She was born in Hawera, Taranaki, New Zealand on 25 June 1917. She was the first woman to reach the rank of Detective in the New Zealand Police.

References

1917 births
1997 deaths
New Zealand police officers
People from Hāwera
Women police officers